The Center for Environmental Innovation in Roofing is a non-profit organization headquartered in Washington, D.C., focusing on the intersection between roofing, energy, and environmental performance.

History
In February 2008, a group of industry leaders established the Center for Environmental Innovation in Roofing, a 501(c)(6) organization designed to promote the knowledge base, development, and use of environmentally responsible, high-performance roof systems. The Center was created with specific objectives:

Serve as a repository for information pertaining to energy, the environment and roofing
Coordinating and encouraging objective research
Serve as a research link between academia and industry and providing a forum for ongoing peer review of such research
Safeguard jurisdiction to ensure new roofing products, systems and services remain within the sphere of the roofing industry
Expand market opportunities
Develop science-based advocacy on behalf of the industry
Coordinate standards and codes, both in the U.S. and abroad

The Center commenced operations on March 4, 2008.

Roof Point

Roof Point is a voluntary, consensus-based document developed by the Research Committee of the Center for Environmental Innovation in Roofing with input from roofing contractors, roof consultants, roofing material manufacturers, roofing research organizations, and other stakeholder groups. Roof Point is designed to evaluate both new and replacement roofs for commercial and institutional low-slope buildings. Much like the LEED building rating system does for the overall environmental impact of buildings, Roof Point provides a means to evaluate roof system environmental performance over the life cycle of the building it covers, providing a useful measure for what constitutes a sustainable roof in design, construction, operation, and decommissioning.

Roof Point is organized into five functional and weighted areas, representing the primary environmental contributions of modern roofing systems:

 Energy management
 Durability/Life cycle management
 Materials management
 Water management
 Environmental innovation in roofing

Roof Point Excellence in Design Award
The Excellence in Design Award was established in 2003 by the National Roofing Contractors Association to recognize those who design long-lasting, energy-efficient, environmentally friendly roof systems according to accepted industry practices.  In 2008, the Center took ownership of the Excellence in Design Award. The Award names an overall winner and category winners for best vegetated roof, the best solar roof, and best roof recycling.  In 2011, the award was renamed the Roof Point Excellence in Design Award.

The Center named Nation's Roof, Lithia Springs, Georgia, the overall winner of its Excellence in Design Award competition during the International Roofing Expo 2009. The best vegetated roof was awarded to the William J. Clinton Presidential Library, built by Tremco, Inc. The best solar roof was awarded to the Fresh & Easy Warehouse in Riverside, California, built by Sika Sarnafil. The best roof recycling was awarded to Duke University Hospital.

See also

Environmental and Energy Study Institute
Energy conservation
Sustainability

References

Business organizations based in the United States
Environmental organizations based in Washington, D.C.
Roofs